Hell to Pay is a 2005 British film by Roberto Gomez Martin, his directorial debut, about a London East End's gangster life based on the semi-autobiographical story of Dave Courtney, who plays character of Dave Malone in the film.

Plot
Dave Malone (Dave Courtney), a British gangster, is set up by his own brother Larry Malone (Billy Murray) to murder a rival crime boss. Dave avoids the scheme and subsequently the murder charge made against him, whilst planning to eliminate the competition and take over the lucrative London crime trade.

The oil-on-canvas depicting the crucifixion used in the film was painted by real-life East End gangster Ronnie Kray as it was given to Dave Courtney as a present just before he died in prison.

Cast
Terry Stone ...  Johnny Murphy (credited as Terry Turbo)
Dave Courtney ...  Dave Malone
Billy Murray ...  Larry Malone 
Andy Beckwith ...  Detective Inspector Beek
Francine Lewis ...  Gangster's wife 
JC Mac ...  Mike-stripper 
Chico Slimani ...  Stripper
Garry Bushell ...  One of Larry Malone's goons 
Ian Freeman ...  Cellmate
Martin Hancock ...  Martin 
Helen Keating ...  Helen 
Dave Legeno ...  Big Vic 
Trevor Mailey ...  Hood 
Adam Saint ...  Adam
John Altman ...  Policeman
Nick Bateman ...  Police officer 
Pete Conway ...  Policeman 
Joanne Guest ...  Policewoman
Charlie Breaker ... Sir Charlie Malone (Uncle)

References

External links
 

British crime drama films
2005 directorial debut films
2005 films
2000s English-language films
2000s British films
2005 crime drama films